Akova is a village in Gülnar district of Mersin Province, Turkey. At  it is situated in the Taurus Mountains to the west of Gülnar. The population of the village was 115 as of 2012.

References

Villages in Gülnar District